Svetlana Karamasheva (née Podosenova; born 24 May 1988) is a Russian middle-distance runner. She competed in the 1500 metres event at the 2014 IAAF World Indoor Championships.

She was disqualified for doping in 2018.

Achievements

References

1988 births
Living people
Russian female middle-distance runners
Place of birth missing (living people)
Russian sportspeople in doping cases
21st-century Russian women